Mary Green (née Tagg; 10 November 1943 – 7 April 2022) was a British sprinter. She competed in the women's 400 metres at the 1968 Summer Olympics.

Green was originally from Norfolk. Her brother, Mike Tagg, was also an athlete and represented Great Britain at the same Olympics. 

She died in April 2022, at the age of 78.

References

External links
 

1943 births
2022 deaths
Athletes (track and field) at the 1968 Summer Olympics
British female sprinters
Olympic athletes of Great Britain
Olympic female sprinters
Sportspeople from Derby